Rubus elegantulus, the showy blackberry, is an uncommon North American species of flowering plant in the rose family. It grows in the northeastern and north-central United States (from Maine to West Virginia, plus Wisconsin and Minnesota) and eastern Canada (Québec, Newfoundland, and all 3 Maritime Provinces).

Rubus elegantulus is an erect perennial 2–4 feet (30–120 cm) tall, with prickles but no hairs. Leaves are palmately compound with 5 leaflets, slightly darker on the upper surface than on the lower. Fruits are black, nearly spherical.

The genetics of Rubus is extremely complex, so that it is difficult to decide on which groups should be recognized as species. There are many rare species with limited ranges such as this. Further study is suggested to clarify the taxonomy. Some studies have suggested that R. elegantulus may have originated as a hybrid between R. allegheniensis and R. pensilvanicus.

References

External links
 

elegantulus
Plants described in 1906
Flora of the United States
Flora of Canada